Prof Cedric William Malcolm Wilson FRSE (23 November 1923 – 27 November 1993) was a 20th-century British pharmacologist and medical historian. In authorship he appears as C. W. M. Wilson. He was founder of the Scottish Society of the History of Medicine.

Life
He was born in Edinburgh on 23 November 1923, the son of the botanist Malcolm Wilson. He was educated at Edinburgh Academy 1933 to 1943 then studied Medicine at Edinburgh University graduating MB ChB in 1949. He obtained a doctorate (PhD) in Pharmacology in 1954 and his medical doctorate (MD) in 1958.

In 1955 he began lecturing in pharmacology at Liverpool University but then became Professor of Pharmacology at Trinity College, Dublin. He then returned to practical medicine as Consulting Physician at Law Hospital in Carluke.

He was elected a Fellow of the Royal Society of Edinburgh in 1972. His proposers were William Wright, William Alexander Bain, James Graham, and Derrick Dunlop.

He died on 27 November 1993, a few days after his 70th birthday.

Publications
Scottish Medical Traditions (1957)
Therapeutic Sources for Prescribing in Great Britain (1963)
The Pharmacological and Epidemiological Aspects of Adolescent Drug Dependence (1966)
The Common Cold and Vitamin C (1973)
Environmental Therapy (1983)

He was a regular contributor to the Journal of Parapsychology

Family
His older brother was Graham Malcolm Wilson.

References

1923 births
1993 deaths
Writers from Edinburgh
People educated at Edinburgh Academy
Alumni of the University of Edinburgh
Academics of the University of Liverpool
British pharmacologists
Fellows of the Royal Society of Edinburgh
Academics of Trinity College Dublin
Medical doctors from Edinburgh